Mohammad-Hossein Zibayinejad, also known as Hossein Nejat, is an Iranian Islamic Revolutionary Guard Corps commander who was served as the deputy for its Intelligence Organization.

Career 
Following the Iranian Revolution, he joined the Mojahedin of the Islamic Revolution Organization, having previously been a member of Mansouroun guerrilla organization along with later fellow IRGC servicemen Rezaei, Shamkhani, Zolghadr and Rashid. In 1981, he was given the responsibility to protect the officials. In 2000, he became the commander of the Vali Amr corps, which is a protective security unit for the Supreme Leader of Iran and served in the capacity for ten years; and reportedly had a key role during the 2009 Iranian presidential election protests. He later served as the IRGC deputy for cultural and social affairs, being replaced by Mohammad Reza Naqdi in late 2016.

References

Living people
Islamic Revolutionary Guard Corps brigadier generals
Mojahedin of the Islamic Revolution Organization politicians
Islamic Revolutionary Guard Corps personnel of the Iran–Iraq War
Year of birth missing (living people)